{{Infobox election
| election_name = 2004 United States Senate election in New Hampshire
| country = New Hampshire
| type = presidential
| ongoing = no
| previous_election = 1998 United States Senate election in New Hampshire
| previous_year = 1998
| next_election = 2010 United States Senate election in New Hampshire
| next_year = 2010
| election_date = November 2, 2004
| image_size = 125x136px
| image1 = Judd Gregg.jpg
| nominee1 = Judd Gregg
| party1 = Republican Party (United States)
| popular_vote1 = 434,847
| percentage1 = 66.2%
| image2 = Doris Haddock 2007.jpg
| nominee2 = Doris Haddock
| party2 = Democratic Party (United States)
| popular_vote2 = 221,549
| percentage2 = 33.7%
| map = 
| map_caption        = Gregg:     Haddock:   
| title = U.S. Senator
| before_election = Judd Gregg
| before_party = Republican Party (United States)
| after_election = Judd Gregg
| after_party = Republican Party (United States)
}}

The 2004 United States Senate election in New Hampshire''' was held November 2, 2004. Incumbent Republican U.S. Senator Judd Gregg won re-election to a third term.

Major candidates

Democratic 
 Doris Haddock, political activist

Republican 
 Judd Gregg, incumbent U.S. Senator since 1993

General election

Predictions

Results

See also 
 2004 United States Senate elections

References 

2004 New Hampshire elections
New Hampshire
2004